Causality: Models, Reasoning, and Inference (2000; updated 2009) is a book by Judea Pearl. It is an exposition and analysis of causality. It is considered to have been instrumental in laying the foundations of the modern debate on causal inference in several fields including statistics, computer science and epidemiology. In this book, Pearl espouses the Structural Causal Model (SCM) that uses structural equation modeling. This model is a competing viewpoint to the Rubin causal model. Some of the material from the book was reintroduced in the more general-audience targeting The Book of Why.

Reviews

The book gave Pearl the 2001 Lakatos Award in Philosophy of Science.

See also
Causality
Causal inference
Structural equation modeling

References

External links
Book Homepage

2009 non-fiction books
Statistics books
Structural equation models